Pocenia is a comune (municipality) in the Province of Udine in the Italian region Friuli-Venezia Giulia, located about  northwest of Trieste and about  southwest of Udine.

Pocenia borders the following municipalities: Castions di Strada, Muzzana del Turgnano, Palazzolo dello Stella, Rivignano Teor, Talmassons.

References

External links
 Official website

Cities and towns in Friuli-Venezia Giulia